Guaqui Municipality is the second municipal section of the Ingavi Province in the  La Paz Department, Bolivia. Its seat is Guaqui.

Division 
The municipality consists of only one canton, Guaqui Canton, which is identical to the municipality.

The people 
The people are predominantly indigenous citizens of Aymara descent.

Places of interest 
Some of the tourist attractions of the municipality are:
 Guaqui festivity from July 23 to July 25 celebrated in honour of Apostle James 
 Apostle James church of Guaqui built between 1625 and 1784 
 Guaqui port

See also 
 Achachi Qala
 Jach'a Uma Chuwani
 Pukara
 Qala Waxrani
 Quta Willk'i
 Tiwanaku River
 Wanq'uni

References 

 www.ine.gov.bo / census 2001: Guaqui Municipality

External links 
 Guaqui Municipality: population data and map (Spanish)

Municipalities of La Paz Department (Bolivia)